The Alta-Dutch Flat School District is a school district in Placer County, California.

It currently maintains two schools, one in Alta, California and one in Emigrant Gap, California. Emigrant Gap Elementary School District was consolidated with Alta-Dutch Flat Elementary School District in 2001. Alta-Dutch Flat School was recognized as a California Distinguished School in 2004. Alta-Dutch Flat School had 8 teachers in 2005, a decrease from 11 in 2003. Currently, Emigrant Gap School has one teacher and six students. The district currently has 123 students. The current interim superintendent is Jim Roberts. Pete Keesler, a former superintendent-principal in the district, is the part-time principal. The current school board for the district is Lindsay Ostrom, David Rosenquist, Joel Baiocchi, Lynette Vrooman and Kathy Mutto. The 2008 Academic Performance Index (API) was 812. As in over 60% of school districts in California, due to declining enrollment and reduction in state funding, the district has made difficult, but significant reductions in staff, but not in programs. Alta-Dutch Flat teachers and staff are among the best in Placer County, and the success of their students, and the support of the community, reflects their training and dedication.

References

External links
 2008 API score
 Accountability Report for Emigrant Gap School
 Accountability Report for Alta Dutch Flat School
 Great Schools profile of Alta Dutch Flat School District
 District Reorganizations and Name Changes 2001

School districts in Placer County, California